Lourdes Domínguez Lino and Arantxa Parra Santonja were the defending champions, but were forced to withdraw due to a right foot injury for Domínguez Lino, before their quarterfinals match against Nuria Llagostera Vives and María José Martínez Sánchez

Nuria Llagostera Vives and María José Martínez Sánchez won in the final 6–2, 6–4, against Iveta Benešová and Petra Cetkovská.

Seeds

Draw

Draw

External links
Draw

2008 Abierto Mexicano Telcel
Abierto Mexicano Telcel